Warren Township is one of fourteen townships in Clinton County, Indiana, United States. As of the 2010 census, its population was 619 and it contained 244 housing units.

History
Originally part of Jackson Township, Warren was made a separate township in 1834.  The first settler in the area was A. F. Whiteman who located on Section 23 in 1830.

The John Young House was listed on the National Register of Historic Places in 1994.

Geography

Unincorporated towns
 Beard
 Middlefork

Adjacent townships
 Burlington Township, Carroll County (north)
 Monroe Township, Howard County (northeast)
 Forest Township (east)
 Michigan Township (south)
 Owen Township (west)
 Democrat Township, Carroll County (northwest)

Major highways
  Indiana State Road 26
  Indiana State Road 29

Cemeteries
The township contains six cemeteries: Campbell, Grays, Old Liberty, Old Prophet, Sims and Veneman.

References
 United States Census Bureau cartographic boundary files
 U.S. Board on Geographic Names

Townships in Clinton County, Indiana
Townships in Indiana
1834 establishments in Indiana
Populated places established in 1834